Kim Jung-suk (born 1 October 1939) is a South Korean former footballer who competed in the 1964 Summer Olympics.

Honours
Korea Tungsten
Korean Semi-professional League (Spring): 1965, 1968
Korean Semi-professional League (Autumn): 1965, 1966
Korean National Championship runner-up: 1968
Korean President's Cup: 1965, 1966

South Korea U20
AFC Youth Championship: 1959

South Korea B
AFC Asian Cup third place: 1964

Individual
Korean President's Cup Best Player: 1965
AFC Asian All Stars: 1965, 1966, 1967, 1968

References

External links
 
 Kim Jung-suk at KFA 
 

1939 births
Living people
South Korean footballers
Olympic footballers of South Korea
Footballers at the 1964 Summer Olympics
1964 AFC Asian Cup players
Korea University alumni
Footballers from Seoul
Association football defenders